The 1917 VFL season was the 21st season of the Victorian Football League (VFL), the highest level senior Australian rules football competition in Victoria.

The season ran from 12 May until 22 September, and comprised a 15-game home-and-away season followed by a finals series featuring the top four clubs.

The premiership was won by the Collingwood Football Club for the fourth time, after it defeated  by 35 points in the 1917 VFL Grand Final.

Premiership season
In 1917, the VFL competition consisted of six teams of 18 on-the-field players each, with no "reserves", although any of the 18 players who had left the playing field for any reason could later resume their place on the field at any time during the match.

Each of the six teams played each other three times in a 15 match home-and-away season (Geelong, Richmond, and South Melbourne each hosting eight games, while Carlton, Collingwood, and Fitzroy each hosted seven).

Once the 15 round home-and-away season had finished, the 1917 VFL Premiers were determined by the specific format and conventions of the amended "Argus system".

Round 1

|- bgcolor="#CCCCFF"
| Home team
| Home team score
| Away team
| Away team score
| Venue
| Date
|- bgcolor="#FFFFFF"
| 
| 11.11 (77)
| 
| 4.4 (28)
| Victoria Park
| 12 May 1917
|- bgcolor="#FFFFFF"
| 
| 9.18 (72)
| 
| 4.14 (38)
| Lake Oval
| 12 May 1917
|- bgcolor="#FFFFFF"
| 
| 6.9 (45)
| 
| 6.9 (45)
| Brunswick Street Oval
| 12 May 1917

Round 2

|- bgcolor="#CCCCFF"
| Home team
| Home team score
| Away team
| Away team score
| Venue
| Date
|- bgcolor="#FFFFFF"
| 
| 6.16 (52)
| 
| 8.16 (64)
| Punt Road Oval
| 19 May 1917
|- bgcolor="#FFFFFF"
| 
| 13.7 (85)
| 
| 8.6 (54)
| Princes Park
| 19 May 1917
|- bgcolor="#FFFFFF"
| 
| 6.10 (46)
| 
| 8.16 (64)
| Corio Oval
| 19 May 1917

Round 3

|- bgcolor="#CCCCFF"
| Home team
| Home team score
| Away team
| Away team score
| Venue
| Date
|- bgcolor="#FFFFFF"
| 
| 14.6 (90)
| 
| 6.16 (52)
| Punt Road Oval
| 26 May 1917
|- bgcolor="#FFFFFF"
| 
| 8.14 (62)
| 
| 11.12 (78)
| Brunswick Street Oval
| 26 May 1917
|- bgcolor="#FFFFFF"
| 
| 5.16 (46)
| 
| 3.13 (31)
| Lake Oval
| 26 May 1917

Round 4

|- bgcolor="#CCCCFF"
| Home team
| Home team score
| Away team
| Away team score
| Venue
| Date
|- bgcolor="#FFFFFF"
| 
| 8.18 (66)
| 
| 6.9 (45)
| Victoria Park
| 2 June 1917
|- bgcolor="#FFFFFF"
| 
| 6.13 (49)
| 
| 5.8 (38)
| Brunswick Street Oval
| 4 June 1917
|- bgcolor="#FFFFFF"
| 
| 5.12 (42)
| 
| 6.7 (43)
| Princes Park
| 4 June 1917

Round 5

|- bgcolor="#CCCCFF"
| Home team
| Home team score
| Away team
| Away team score
| Venue
| Date
|- bgcolor="#FFFFFF"
| 
| 14.13 (97)
| 
| 7.11 (53)
| Princes Park
| 9 June 1917
|- bgcolor="#FFFFFF"
| 
| 5.20 (50)
| 
| 8.7 (55)
| Lake Oval
| 9 June 1917
|- bgcolor="#FFFFFF"
| 
| 6.7 (43)
| 
| 8.9 (57)
| Corio Oval
| 9 June 1917

Round 6

|- bgcolor="#CCCCFF"
| Home team
| Home team score
| Away team
| Away team score
| Venue
| Date
|- bgcolor="#FFFFFF"
| 
| 6.14 (50)
| 
| 6.11 (47)
| Corio Oval
| 16 June 1917
|- bgcolor="#FFFFFF"
| 
| 4.17 (41)
| 
| 8.9 (57)
| Princes Park
| 16 June 1917
|- bgcolor="#FFFFFF"
| 
| 7.8 (50)
| 
| 6.14 (50)
| Punt Road Oval
| 16 June 1917

Round 7

|- bgcolor="#CCCCFF"
| Home team
| Home team score
| Away team
| Away team score
| Venue
| Date
|- bgcolor="#FFFFFF"
| 
| 8.4 (52)
| 
| 9.11 (65)
| Brunswick Street Oval
| 23 June 1917
|- bgcolor="#FFFFFF"
| 
| 9.17 (71)
| 
| 6.3 (39)
| Lake Oval
| 23 June 1917
|- bgcolor="#FFFFFF"
| 
| 13.14 (92)
| 
| 8.7 (55)
| Victoria Park
| 23 June 1917

Round 8

|- bgcolor="#CCCCFF"
| Home team
| Home team score
| Away team
| Away team score
| Venue
| Date
|- bgcolor="#FFFFFF"
| 
| 11.15 (81)
| 
| 5.4 (34)
| Corio Oval
| 30 June 1917
|- bgcolor="#FFFFFF"
| 
| 11.11 (77)
| 
| 10.14 (74)
| Victoria Park
| 30 June 1917
|- bgcolor="#FFFFFF"
| 
| 9.11 (65)
| 
| 7.12 (54)
| Princes Park
| 30 June 1917

Round 9

|- bgcolor="#CCCCFF"
| Home team
| Home team score
| Away team
| Away team score
| Venue
| Date
|- bgcolor="#FFFFFF"
| 
| 13.9 (87)
| 
| 5.8 (38)
| Punt Road Oval
| 7 July 1917
|- bgcolor="#FFFFFF"
| 
| 13.12 (90)
| 
| 10.13 (73)
| Lake Oval
| 7 July 1917
|- bgcolor="#FFFFFF"
| 
| 3.11 (29)
| 
| 4.10 (34)
| Corio Oval
| 7 July 1917

Round 10

|- bgcolor="#CCCCFF"
| Home team
| Home team score
| Away team
| Away team score
| Venue
| Date
|- bgcolor="#FFFFFF"
| 
| 9.10 (64)
| 
| 8.9 (57)
| Brunswick Street Oval
| 14 July 1917
|- bgcolor="#FFFFFF"
| 
| 10.19 (79)
| 
| 2.11 (23)
| Victoria Park
| 14 July 1917
|- bgcolor="#FFFFFF"
| 
| 6.10 (46)
| 
| 7.9 (51)
| Punt Road Oval
| 14 July 1917

Round 11

|- bgcolor="#CCCCFF"
| Home team
| Home team score
| Away team
| Away team score
| Venue
| Date
|- bgcolor="#FFFFFF"
| 
| 11.19 (85)
| 
| 7.7 (49)
| Victoria Park
| 21 July 1917
|- bgcolor="#FFFFFF"
| 
| 14.14 (98)
| 
| 6.13 (49)
| Lake Oval
| 21 July 1917
|- bgcolor="#FFFFFF"
| 
| 5.15 (45)
| 
| 8.11 (59)
| Brunswick Street Oval
| 21 July 1917

Round 12

|- bgcolor="#CCCCFF"
| Home team
| Home team score
| Away team
| Away team score
| Venue
| Date
|- bgcolor="#FFFFFF"
| 
| 5.11 (41)
| 
| 7.14 (56)
| Punt Road Oval
| 28 July 1917
|- bgcolor="#FFFFFF"
| 
| 4.13 (37)
| 
| 3.8 (26)
| Princes Park
| 28 July 1917
|- bgcolor="#FFFFFF"
| 
| 10.3 (63)
| 
| 12.10 (82)
| Corio Oval
| 28 July 1917

Round 13

|- bgcolor="#CCCCFF"
| Home team
| Home team score
| Away team
| Away team score
| Venue
| Date
|- bgcolor="#FFFFFF"
| 
| 5.12 (42)
| 
| 7.8 (50)
| Punt Road Oval
| 11 August 1917
|- bgcolor="#FFFFFF"
| 
| 7.3 (45)
| 
| 14.17 (101)
| Brunswick Street Oval
| 11 August 1917
|- bgcolor="#FFFFFF"
| 
| 8.7 (55)
| 
| 6.14 (50)
| Lake Oval
| 11 August 1917

Round 14

|- bgcolor="#CCCCFF"
| Home team
| Home team score
| Away team
| Away team score
| Venue
| Date
|- bgcolor="#FFFFFF"
| 
| 6.16 (52)
| 
| 2.9 (21)
| Victoria Park
| 18 August 1917
|- bgcolor="#FFFFFF"
| 
| 10.11 (71)
| 
| 7.11 (53)
| Punt Road Oval
| 18 August 1917
|- bgcolor="#FFFFFF"
| 
| 5.8 (38)
| 
| 10.11 (71)
| Corio Oval
| 18 August 1917

Round 15

|- bgcolor="#CCCCFF"
| Home team
| Home team score
| Away team
| Away team score
| Venue
| Date
|- bgcolor="#FFFFFF"
| 
| 12.8 (80)
| 
| 4.17 (41)
| Princes Park
| 25 August 1917
|- bgcolor="#FFFFFF"
| 
| 12.13 (85)
| 
| 7.5 (47)
| Lake Oval
| 25 August 1917
|- bgcolor="#FFFFFF"
| 
| 8.17 (65)
| 
| 9.9 (63)
| Corio Oval
| 25 August 1917

Ladder

Finals

Semi finals

|- bgcolor="#CCCCFF"
| Home team
| Score
| Away team
| Score
| Venue
| Attendance
| Date
|- bgcolor="#FFFFFF"
| 
| 6.8 (44)
| 
| 6.17 (53)
| MCG
| 15,605
| Saturday, 1 September
|- bgcolor="#FFFFFF"
| 
| 13.17 (95)
| 
| 3.17 (35)
| MCG
| 16,505
| Saturday, 8 September

Preliminary Final

|- bgcolor="#CCCCFF"
| Home team
| Score
| Away team
| Score
| Venue
| Attendance
| Date
|- bgcolor="#FFFFFF"
| 
| 7.10 (52)
| 
| 8.10 (58)
| MCG
| 22,786
| Saturday, 15 September

Grand final

|- bgcolor="#CCCCFF"
| Home team
| Score
| Away team
| Score
| Venue
| Attendance
| Date
|- bgcolor="#FFFFFF"
| 
| 9.20 (74)
| 
| 5.9 (39)
| MCG
| 28,512
| Saturday, 22 September

Awards
 The 1917 VFL Premiership team was Collingwood.
 The VFL's leading goalkicker was Dick Lee of Collingwood with 50 goals (54 after finals).
 Richmond took the "wooden spoon" in 1917.

Notable events
 Geelong and South Melbourne, having refused to compete in 1916 on "patriotic grounds" returned to the VFL competition, having concluded that the drop in the number of recruits in 1916 indicated that the VFL competition had no effect on military recruitment. The Geelong players met their own expenses and played as amateurs, with the club donating all of its 1917 profits to war funds.
 On 12 May 1917, recruiting officers visiting VFL grounds were heckled by spectators. On another occasion a Fitzroy crowd attacked a recruiting sergeant.
 On 4 August, the entire thirteenth round was put back a week, at the request of the State War Council, so that recruiting meetings could be held at each VFL ground.

References

 Rogers, S. & Brown, A., Every Game Ever Played: VFL/AFL Results 1897–1997 (Sixth Edition), Viking Books, (Ringwood), 1998.

External links
 1917 Season - AFL Tables

Australian Football League seasons
VFL season